Samoa participated at the 2018 Summer Youth Olympics in Buenos Aires, Argentina from 6 October to 18 October 2018.

Competitors
The following is the list of number of competitors participating at the Games per sport/discipline.

Archery

Individual

Team

Boxing
Samoa qualified 3 boys based on its performance at Oceania Boxing Championship in Apia, Samoa.

Boys

Rugby sevens

Group stage

Fifth place game

Weightlifting

Samoa was given a quota by the tripartite committee to compete in weightlifting.

References

2018 in Samoan sport
Nations at the 2018 Summer Youth Olympics
Samoa at the Youth Olympics